Christopher Columbus is an American jazz song composed by Chu Berry with lyrics by Andy Razaf. Pianist Fats Waller turned the tune into a 1936 novelty hit which was subsequently recorded by numerous other artists and became a jazz standard. Jimmy Mundy wrote the lead into a medley with "Sing, Sing, Sing" for Benny Goodman.

Artists who covered this song

Van Alexander
Henry "Red" Allen
Harry Allen
Woody Allen
Gene Ammons
Ernestine Anderson
Rocco and the Stompers
Ray Anthony
Ray Anthony & His Orchestra
Leroy Anthony & His Orchestra
Jimmy Archey
Louis Armstrong
Louis Armstrong & His All-Stars
Paul Asaro
Asva
Swiss Ballroom Orchestra
Ball
DRS-Big Band
Big Band Sounds
Chris Barber
Len Barry
Dan Barrett
Sidney Bechet
Alan Beechey
Thilo Berg Big Band
Thilo Berg
Chu Berry
Wild Bill Davison
Acker Bilk
Barnicle Bill Trio
Sandy Brown
Dave Brubeck
Darius Brubeck
Chris Brubeck
Papa Bue Jensen
Papa Bue's Viking Jazz Band
Judy Carmichael
Ralph Carney
Frankie Capp Big Band
Benny Carter
Buck Clayton
The Buck Clayton Legacy
Geoff Cole & His Hot Five
Geoff Cole
Buddy Cole
Paolo Conte
Hollie Cook
Bob Crosby
Graham Dalby & the Grahamophones
Graham Dalby
James Dapogny's Chicago Jazz Band
James Dapogny
Sterling Davis and His Orchestra
Brian Dee
Vic Dickenson
Doctor Dixie Jazz Band
Tommy Dorsey/Lionel Hampton
Tommy Dorsey
Serge Dutfoy
The Easy Riders
Roy Eldridge
Roy Eldridge & His Orchestra
Les Elgart
Larry Elgart & His Manhattan Swing Orchestra
Les Elgart
Duke Ellington
Prince Fatty
Buddy Featherstonhaugh
Ernie Fields
Ernie Fields & His Orchestra
Pete Fountain
Winston Francis
Jim Galloway
Louis Garcia & His Swing Band
Gene Gifford
Dizzy Gillespie
Claude Gnocchi
Benny Goodman
Benny Goodman & His Orchestra
Benny Goodman Big Band
Marty Grosz
Kamikaze Ground Crew
Henghel Gualdi
Bobby Hackett
Allan Hartwell/Cozy Cole
Joe Haymes & His Orchestra
Joe Haymes
Fletcher Henderson/Johannes Heesters
Fletcher Henderson & His Orchestra
Fletcher Henderson
The Hothousehooters
Hot Jazz Band
Gwen Howard
The Ink Spots
Oliver Jackson
The Juggernauts
Klaus Kinski
Andy Kirk
Andy Kirk & His Clouds of Joy
Andy Kirk & His Twelve Clouds of Joy
Gene Krupa
Gene Krupa /Benny Goodman
Jim Kweskin & the Jug Band
Jim Kweskin
The Lake Records All-Star Jazz Band
Willie Lewis
Willie Lewis & His Negro Band
Humphrey Lyttelton
Humphrey Lyttelton & His Band
Machito & His Afro-Cubans
Machito
Barbara Mason
Billy May & His Orchestra
Billy May
Jack McDuff
Floyd McDaniel & the Blues Swingers
Floyd McDaniel
Mezz Mezzrow
Lucky Millinder
Bob Mintzer
Guy Mitchell
Barbara Morrison
Danny Moss
Tony Muréna
Natty
Albert Nicholas
New Orleans All Stars
Kid Ory
Dave Pell
King Perry
Planet D Nonet
Don Redman
Don Redman & His Orchestra
Harry Reser
Little Roy
Randy Sandke
Antti Sarpila
Artie Shaw
Charlie Shavers
Len Skeat
Rossano Sportiello
Teddy Stauffer
Teddy Stauffer & Seine Original Teddies
Maxine Sullivan
Maxine Sullivan & Her All-Stars
Maxine Sullivan & Her Jazz All-Stars
Ralph Sutton
Hollywood Swing Orchestra
The Swingcats
Paris Swing Orchestra
Milano Swingtet
Jack Teagarden
Teo
Jerry Tilitz
Bruce Turner
James Van Buren
Larry Verne
Fats Waller
Fats Waller & His Rhythm
Dinah Washington
Lawrence Welk
Teddy Wilson
Bob Wilder Sextet
Mary Lou Williams
Teddy Wilson & His Orchestra
Xit

References

 Christopher Columbus - AllMusic.com

Jazz songs
Songs written by Andy Razaf
Year of song missing